The Montserrat Football Association is the governing body of football in the British Overseas Territory of Montserrat. It is in charge of the Montserrat national football team and is also responsible for the league in Montserrat, the Montserrat Championship.

Association staff

References

External links
 Montserrat at the FIFA website
 Montserrat at CONCACAF site

CONCACAF member associations
Football in Montserrat
Sports organizations established in 1994
1994 establishments in Montserrat